Mowmenabad (also Romanized as Mow’menābād) is a village in Damankuh Rural District, in the Central District of Damghan County, Semnan Province, Iran. At the 2006 census, its population was 550, in 159 families.

References 

Populated places in Damghan County